The 1944 World Series was an all-St. Louis World Series, matching the St. Louis Cardinals and St. Louis Browns at Sportsman's Park. It would be 76 years before another World Series had all of its games played in a single ballpark: the  Series used Globe Life Field in Arlington, Texas as a neutral site due to health concerns regarding the COVID-19 pandemic.

1944 saw perhaps the nadir of 20th-century baseball, as the long-moribund St. Louis Browns won their only American League pennant. Some of the players were 4-Fs, rejected by the military for physical defects or limitations that precluded duty.  Others divided their time between factory work in defense industries and baseball, some being able to play ball only on weekends. Some players avoided the draft by chance, despite being physically able to serve. Stan Musial of the Cardinals was one. Musial, enlisting in early 1945, missed one season. He rejoined the Cardinals in 1946.

As both teams called Sportsman's Park home, the traditional 2–3–2 home field assignment was used (instead of the wartime 3–4).  The Junior World Series of that same year, partly hosted in Baltimore's converted football stadium, easily outdrew the "real" Series and attracted attention to Baltimore as a potential major league city.  Ten years later, the Browns transferred there and became the Orioles.  The Orioles would go on to win the 1966 World Series, and become the last of the AL's eight charter franchises to do so.  Another all-Missouri World Series was played 41 years later, with the Kansas City Royals defeating the Cardinals in seven games.

The Series was also known as the "Trolley Series," "Streetcar Series," or the "St. Louis Showdown." Coincidentally, this World Series was played the same year Metro-Goldwyn-Mayer released the musical film Meet Me in St. Louis. It remains one of two World Series played that featured two teams from the same city other than New York; the other was the 1906 World Series between the two Chicago teams. The 1989 World Series featured two teams from the San Francisco metropolitan area, but not the same city. It was also the first World Series where both teams play West of the Mississippi River.

This is the only World Series to date in which neither team was credited with a stolen base.

Background
Many of the game's best players were called away for World War II, and the result was a seriously depleted pool of talent. The top team in the American League was the St. Louis Browns, who collectively batted .252 en route to their only pennant in 52 seasons. They only had one .300 hitter in outfielder Mike Kreevich (who barely made it at .301), one man with 20 home runs, shortstop Vern Stephens (who hit exactly 20), and one player over the 85 runs batted in mark, Stephens, who knocked in 109 to lead the league. On the mound, the Browns boasted Nels Potter and Jack Kramer, who combined for 36 victories. The team squeaked into first place by winning 11 out of their final 12 games, including the last 4 in a row over the defending champion New York Yankees. The last victory, combined with Detroit's loss to Washington, enabled St. Louis to finish one game ahead of the Tigers in the American League. Their 89–65 record would be the worst for an AL champion until the Minnesota Twins won the pennant in 1987 with a record of 85–77.

On the other side of Sportsman's Park, the other Major League team from St. Louis was doing business as usual. In making off with their third straight National League pennant (leading by  games over Pittsburgh), manager Billy Southworth's Cardinals had won 105 games and ran their three-year victory total to 316. The Cardinals were the first National League franchise with three consecutive 100 win seasons. The 1944 club featured league MVP Marty Marion and future Hall of Famer Stan Musial.

Summary

Matchups

Game 1

George McQuinn hit the Browns' only home run of the series to put his team ahead in the fourth inning, while Denny Galehouse outpitched World Series veteran Mort Cooper to hold on for the win.

Game 2

Blix Donnelly came in as a relief pitcher in the eighth inning, and tallied no runs, two hits and seven strikeouts for the win. Ken O'Dea's pinch-hit single in the 11th scored the winning run.

Game 3

Jack Kramer struck out ten batters on the way to a 6–2 Browns triumph, the last World Series game the team would win until the 1966 World Series, as the Baltimore Orioles.

Game 4

Browns starter Sig Jakucki had been away from baseball for five years, but returned to win 13 games in 1944. He lasted only three innings giving up four runs. Stan Musial hit a two-run homer in the first, and the Browns never recovered. Harry Brecheen went the distance for the win despite giving up nine hits and four walks.

Game 5

Mort Cooper recovered from his opening game loss to beat Galehouse with a seven-hit, 2–0 shutout. In the Cardinals' 1942–1944 stranglehold on the National League championship, Cooper had won 65 games and thrown 23 shutouts.

Game 6

For Game 6, it was Max Lanier and Ted Wilks (who both had 17 wins and shared a 2.65 ERA) that wrote the final chapter to the Browns' "Cinderella season" with a 3–1 victory that wrapped up the Cardinals' second Series title in three years. Ted Wilks was brilliant in relief, retiring all 11 Browns he faced, clinching the Cardinals' fifth World Series title.

Composite line score
1944 World Series (4–2): St. Louis Cardinals (N.L.) over St. Louis Browns (A.L.)

Notes

See also
1944 Negro World Series

References

External links

World Series
World Series
St. Louis Cardinals postseason
St. Louis Browns
1940s in St. Louis
World Series
October 1944 sports events
Baseball competitions in St. Louis